Dean Schneider (born October 3, 1992) is a Swiss animal sanctuary founder and social media personality based in South Africa.

Career 
Schneider studied finance and at age 21, became an entrepreneur and created his own financial planning company. After three years, he had over fifty employees. Schneider was a banker and financial planner in Switzerland before moving to South Africa in 2017 to establish a wildlife sanctuary and rehabilitation center, Hakuna Mipaka (Swahili for "no limits"). It is a 400 ha (4 square kilometer) estate for lions born in captivity. A separate area hosts zebras, impalas, kudu, hyenas, baboons and cheetahs.

Before moving to South Africa, Schneider flew to Africa more than a dozen times to visit land, make contacts, seek sponsors, and develop a 70-page management plan while waiting for grants. Schneider shares, on social media, interactions with wildlife with the support of a personal assistant and a content manager.

, Schneider has 10 million followers on Instagram. He spends up to seven hours a day on Instagram and answers approximately 800 comments and posts in different languages. Schneider was inspired by Steve Irwin to help people connect with wildlife. In May 2020, UK's The Times newspaper reported that Schneider is the subject of an animal abuse investigation by South Africa's animal welfare agency with regard to a video Schneider had uploaded of himself striking at one of his lion cubs with his fist after one of its claws caught on his face, that led to bleeding above his right eye. Schneider defended his actions and blamed those critical of him for this kind of false and incomplete understanding of the situation and explained that the lion was unharmed and he was teaching it about boundaries. There is no official record for any investigation about this event.

References

External links
 

Living people
Swiss Internet celebrities
Animal welfare workers
Financial planners
21st-century Swiss businesspeople
Swiss company founders
Swiss emigrants to South Africa
Keepers of animal sanctuaries
1992 births